Captain Wonder may refer to:

Captain Wonder (DC Comics), a DC Comics supervillain
Captain Wonder (Timely Comics), a Timely Comics superhero

See also
 Wonder Man (disambiguation)